The Nant Ffrancon Pass in Snowdonia, North Wales is at  at Pont Wern-gof, about one-third of a mile beyond the eastern end of Llyn Ogwen. The A5 road crosses it between Llyn Ogwen and Bethesda, Gwynedd

Geography
Nant Ffrancon itself is a steep-sided glacial valley dropping to Bethesda between the Glyderau and the Carneddau. The valley starts in Cwm Idwal, carrying water from Llyn-y-Cwn through Twll Du and Llyn Idwal to join the Ogwen Valley below the Ogwen Falls on Afon Ogwen.

Road
The A5 road makes a long steady climb between Bethesda, Gwynedd, and Llyn Ogwen in Conwy.
From here the road descends through Nant y Benglog to Capel Curig and through to Betws-y-Coed. 

The A5 is the Holyhead to London trunk road. 
The original road through the Nant Ffrancon was constructed by Lord Penrhyn in the late 18th century. Lord Penrhyn's road, largely followed the valley floor, and at Capel Curig in 1801 he built a coaching inn, which is now Plas y Brenin, the UK National Mountaineering Centre.

Thomas Telford re-engineered it between 1810 and 1826. Telford carved much of his road out of the north-eastern slopes of the Nant Ffrancon, thereby encountering difficulties in construction and future maintenance. But this enabled him to observe a maximum grade of 1 in 14 along the whole route from London to Holyhead in order to facilitate horse drawn mail coaches throughout.

In popular culture
It has been used as a filming location for British film-makers, including 
the Carry On film Carry On up the Khyberdoubling for the Khyber Pass
 the Doctor Who serial The Abominable Snowmendoubling for the Himalayas
 the 1950s film The Inn of the Sixth Happiness.

Nant Ffrancon Golf Club (now defunct) appeared in the late 1920s/30s. The club was wound up in 1936.

References

Bethesda, Gwynedd
Capel Curig
Llandygai
Llanllechid
Mountain passes of Conwy County Borough
Roads in Conwy County Borough
Tourism in Conwy County Borough
Mountain passes of Gwynedd
Roads in Gwynedd
Tourism in Gwynedd
Mountain passes of Snowdonia
Roads in Snowdonia
Tourism in Snowdonia